Thomas Barr (born 24 July 1992) is an Irish track and field athlete who competes in the sprints and hurdles.

International career
In 2014, Barr was a semi-finalist at the 2014 European Athletics Championships in the 400 meter hurdles.
In 2015, he finished 3rd at the Qatar Athletic Super Grand Prix as part of the 2015 IAAF Diamond League.

Barr won gold in the 400 metres hurdles at the 2015 World University Games (Summer Universiade) in Gwangju, South Korea with a time of 48.78 seconds.

On 15 August at the 2016 Summer Olympics, Barr finished second in his heat of the 400m hurdles in a season best time of 48.93. The following day he broke the Irish record and won his semi-final to qualify for the final in a time of 48.39. He finished fourth in the final, again breaking the Irish record with a time of 47.97.

In August 2017, Barr was forced to withdraw from the 400m hurdles semi-final heats at the 2017 World Championships in Athletics after a bout of gastroenteritis.

On 9 August 2018, Barr won bronze in the 400m hurdles at the  2018 European Athletics Championships with a season best time of 48.31, his second fastest time ever.

Awards
In April 2015, Barr was named the European Athlete of the Month for, in part, being part of a national relay record and having a world-best time in the 400 metre hurdles.

Barr was named as the 2016 Athlete of the Year at the National Athletics Awards on 30 November 2016.

Records
Barr holds the Irish national record in the 400 metre hurdles.
In 2014 he was also part of the relay team that set the Irish national record in the 4 × 400 metres relay.

Personal life
Barr is the younger brother of Irish Olympic track athlete Jessie Barr. He is from Dunmore East in Waterford where he attended Killea boys primary school and De la Salle school, Waterford. He also has a sister Becky and his parents are Tommy and Martina Barr.

References

External links
 
 
 
 

1992 births
Irish male hurdlers
Living people
World Athletics Championships athletes for Ireland
Athletes (track and field) at the 2016 Summer Olympics
Olympic athletes of Ireland
Universiade medalists in athletics (track and field)
European Championships (multi-sport event) bronze medalists
European Athletics Championships medalists
Universiade gold medalists for Ireland
Medalists at the 2015 Summer Universiade
Athletes (track and field) at the 2020 Summer Olympics